The 2018–19 Russian National Football League was the 27th season of Russia's second-tier football league since the dissolution of the Soviet Union. The season began on 17 July 2018 and ended on 25 May 2019.

Team changes

To FNL
Promoted from PFL
 Chertanovo Moscow
 Armavir
 Mordovia Saransk
 Krasnodar-2

Relegated from Premier League
 SKA-Khabarovsk

From FNL
Relegated to PFL
 Volgar Astrakhan

Promoted to Premier League
 Orenburg
 Krylia Sovetov Samara
 Yenisey Krasnoyarsk

Excluded teams
Amkar Perm and Tosno were excluded from Premier League due to financial problems, but were also refused a license for the 2018–19 Russian Professional Football League, being subsequently dissolved.

Kuban Krasnodar was excluded from championship due to financial problems, then being dissolved.

Ararat Moscow was promoted from 2017–18 PFL, but were refused a license for the 2018–19 Russian National Football League, the club being subsequently dissolved.

Teams spared from relegation
Zenit-2 Saint Petersburg, Rotor Volgograd, Luch Vladivostok, Tyumen and Fakel Voronezh were spared from relegation due to lack of teams enrolled for the 2018–19 season.

Other teams
Sakhalin Yuzhno-Sakhalinsk finished on the promotion place at the end of the 2017–18 PFL season, but refused to be promoted.

Renamed teams
Dynamo Saint Petersburg was moved from Saint Petersburg to Sochi and renamed as PFC Sochi.

Olimpiyets Nizhny Novgorod was renamed to FC Nizhny Novgorod.

Luch-Energiya Vladivostok was renamed to Luch Vladivostok.

Stadia by capacity

Stadia by locations

Personnel and kits 

Note: Flags indicate national team as has been defined under FIFA eligibility rules. Players and Managers may hold more than one non-FIFA nationality.

League table

Results

Statistics

Top goalscorers

References

External links
Official website

2018–19 in Russian football leagues
Russian First League seasons
Rus